Patrick Mitchell is a British Virgin Islands professional football manager.

Career
Since January until December 2002 and since January until March 2008 he coached the British Virgin Islands national football team.

External links
Profile at Soccerway.com
Profile at Soccerpunter.com

Year of birth missing (living people)
Living people
British Virgin Islands football managers
British Virgin Islands national football team managers
Place of birth missing (living people)